This list of Vogue Polska cover models is a catalog of cover models who have appeared on the cover of Vogue Polska, the Polish edition of Vogue magazine, starting with the magazine's first issue in March 2018.

2018

2019

2020

2021

2022

2023

External links
Vogue Polska
Vogue Polska at Models.com

Polska
Vogue
Polish fashion